Michael Dickson (born 4 January 1996) is an Australian professional American football punter for the Seattle Seahawks of the National Football League (NFL). He played college football at Texas. Regarded as one of the best punters in the league, his career punt average of 47.6 yards per punt ranks as the highest in NFL history.

Early life
Born in Sydney, Dickson first played soccer in his youth before switching to Australian rules football at the age of 9. In his first year of playing Australian rules football,  he earned the Golden Boot award for having the best kicking. He excelled in Australian football while playing for the University of New South Wales- Eastern Suburbs Bulldogs in the local Sydney AFL competition and was subsequently placed in the Sydney Swans talent academy as a teenager. He continued to play for UNSW-ES and the Swans reserves in the North East Australian Football League in an attempt to be drafted to a professional AFL team but was overlooked at the 2014 AFL draft. Dickson's Australian football career highlight occurred when he was chosen to play for the Swans in the 2014 NEAFL Grand Final. The Swans were defeated by a two-point margin in the final.

In 2015, at the age of 19, he moved to Melbourne to trial with Prokick Australia, a coaching program designed to help aspiring kickers and punters cross the Pacific and crack American football. Through his Prokick Australia experience, he was picked up by the University of Texas as a punter by head coach Charlie Strong.

College career

In his first season with the Longhorns, Dickson had 77 punts for 3,179 net yards for a 41.3 average in 2015. In the 2016 season, he had 65 punts for 3,079 net yards for a 47.4 average. In 2017, Dickson won the Ray Guy Award and was a unanimous All-American. Dickson was named MVP of the 2017 Texas Bowl. In his junior season, he had 84 punts for 3,984 net yards for a 47.4 average. In late December 2017, it was announced that Dickson would forgo his senior year at Texas in favor of the 2018 NFL Draft.

Collegiate statistics

Professional career

Dickson was drafted by the Seattle Seahawks in the fifth round, 149th overall, of the 2018 NFL Draft. Dickson would go on to win the punting job, after the Seahawks released longtime veteran Jon Ryan during the preseason. He made his NFL debut in the Seahawks' season opener against the Denver Broncos. In the 27–24 loss, he had six punts for 354 net yards.

Dickson was named NFC Special Teams Player of the Week for his performance in Week 8 against the Detroit Lions. With minutes remaining at fourth-and-8 from their own three-yard line, Dickson was instructed to waste time in the end zone before giving up an intentional safety. Instead, after receiving the snap, he ran it nine yards for the first down, sealing the win. The unscripted play was later dubbed "The Aussie Sweep." Dickson was named the NFC Special Teams Player of the Month for November 2018.

Dickson punted the ball 78 times for 3,759 yards in the 2018 season. His average of 48.2 yards per punt ranked as the second-highest in the league. In addition to punting, Dickson occasionally used the previously obscure drop kick maneuver on kickoffs for the Seahawks, both onside kicks and standard deep kicks. For his efforts, Dickson was voted into the 2019 Pro Bowl, the first rookie punter to participate since Dale Hatcher in 1985. In addition, Dickson was named as a first-team All-Pro.

In the 2019 season, Dickson had 74 punts for 3,341 yards, an average of 45.2 yards per punt.

In Week 2 of the 2020 season, against the New England Patriots on Sunday Night Football, Dickson punted four times (50-yard average) with all four of them landing inside the 20-yard line during the 35–30 win.  He would be named the NFC Special Teams Player of the Week for the performance. In Week 15 against the Washington Football Team, Dickson punted four times, all landing inside the 20-yard-line, earning another NFC Special Teams Player of the Week honor. During the 2020 season, Dickson punted 61 times for 3,028 yards, with his punting average of 49.6 yards being the second-highest in the league, and the 9th highest single-season average of all time.

Dickson signed a four-year, $14.5 million contract extension with the Seahawks on 4 June 2021.

During Week 5 of the 2021 season, in a game against the Los Angeles Rams, Dickson initially had a punt blocked. He then chased down the football behind the line of scrimmage, picking it up with one hand, and punting it for a second time while on the run, reminiscent of Australian rules football. The punt would go for 68 yards, his longest of the season, and be downed on the Rams' 10-yard line. The "double punt" received national attention due to its relative obscurity, and is considered one of the most memorable special teams plays of all time.

Dickson punted the ball a career-high 83 times for 3,895 yards during the 2021 season, an average of 46.9 yards per punt. He pinned 40 punts inside the opponents' 20-yard line, the most in the league that season, and the 10th most in a single season in NFL history.

See also
List of players who have converted from one football code to another

References

External links
Seattle Seahawks bio
Texas Longhorns bio

1996 births
Living people
Australian players of American football
Sportspeople from Sydney
American football punters
Texas Longhorns football players
All-American college football players
Seattle Seahawks players
Australian rules football players that played in the NFL
Footballers who switched code
National Conference Pro Bowl players